Joseph Millar is an American poet. He was raised in western Pennsylvania and after an adult life spent mostly in the SF Bay Area and the Northwest, he divides his time between Raleigh, NC and Richmond, CA.

Life
Millar received a BA degree from the University of Pennsylvania in 1967 and an MA degree from Johns Hopkins University in 1970. He has worked as a telephone installation foreman and commercial fisherman and in 1997 gave up this blue collar life to try his hand at teaching. He has poems about fatherhood, labor, relationships and the life of the American man in the 20th Century.

His work has appeared in many magazines and journals, including
The Alaska Quarterly Review, "DoubleTake," Ploughshares, Poetry International, and Prairie Schooner, The Southern Review, TriQuarterly, New Letters, Raleigh Review and Shenandoah.

He has taught at Mount Hood Community College, Oregon State University. He now teaches in the MFA in Writing Program at Pacific University and the Esalen Institute.

He is married to poet Dorianne Laux; they divide their time between Raleigh, North Carolina and Richmond, CA.

Awards
In 2002, Millar was awarded a Grant from the National Endowment for the Arts, and in 2008 his work won a Pushcart Prize. He has also been the recipient of grants from the Montalvo Center for the Arts and from Oregon Literary Arts. In 2012, he was selected as a Guggenheim Fellow.

Works
 Overtime: Poems, Eastern Washington University Press, 2001, a finalist for the Oregon Book Award, 
Fortune, Eastern Washington University Press, 2007, 
Blue Rust, Carnegie Mellon University Press, 2012, .
 Kingdom, Carnegie Mellon University Press, 2017, 

chapbooks 
"Slow Dancer", Cherry Valley Editions, 1992, 
"Nightbound", Idaho Review Press, 2009 
"Bestiary," from Red Dragonfly Press, 2010.

References

External links
Pacific University MFA Faculty
JOSEPH MILLAR

Living people
Year of birth missing (living people)
Poets from Pennsylvania
University of Pennsylvania alumni
Johns Hopkins University alumni
American male poets
Oregon State University faculty
Pacific University faculty
Writers from Eugene, Oregon
University of Oregon faculty
Mt. Hood Community College
20th-century American poets
20th-century American male writers
21st-century American poets
21st-century American male writers